Oktyabrsky District is the name of several administrative and municipal divisions in Russia. The districts are generally named for the October Revolution of 1917.

Districts of the federal subjects

Oktyabrsky District, Amur Oblast, an administrative and municipal district of Amur Oblast
Oktyabrsky District, Chelyabinsk Oblast, an administrative and municipal district of Chelyabinsk Oblast
Oktyabrsky District, Jewish Autonomous Oblast, an administrative and municipal district of the Jewish Autonomous Oblast
Oktyabrsky District, Republic of Kalmykia, an administrative and municipal district of the Republic of Kalmykia
Oktyabrsky District, Khanty-Mansi Autonomous Okrug, an administrative and municipal district of Khanty–Mansi Autonomous Okrug
Oktyabrsky District, Kostroma Oblast, an administrative and municipal district of Kostroma Oblast
Oktyabrsky District, Kursk Oblast, an administrative and municipal district of Kursk Oblast
Oktyabrsky District, Orenburg Oblast, an administrative and municipal district of Orenburg Oblast
Oktyabrsky District, Perm Krai, an administrative and municipal district of Perm Krai
Oktyabrsky District, Primorsky Krai, an administrative and municipal district of Primorsky Krai
Oktyabrsky District, Rostov Oblast, an administrative and municipal district of Rostov Oblast
Oktyabrsky District, Volgograd Oblast, an administrative and municipal district of Volgograd Oblast

City divisions
Oktyabrsky Territorial Okrug, Arkhangelsk, a territorial okrug of the city of Arkhangelsk, the administrative center of Arkhangelsk Oblast
Oktyabrsky City District, Barnaul, a city district of Barnaul, the administrative center of Altai Krai
Oktyabrsky City District, Grozny, a city district of Grozny, the capital of the Chechen Republic
Oktyabrsky City District, Irkutsk, a city district of Irkutsk, the administrative center of Irkutsk Oblast
Oktyabrsky City District, Ivanovo, a city district of Ivanovo, the administrative center of Ivanovo Oblast
Oktyabrsky City District, Izhevsk, a city district of Izhevsk, the capital of the Udmurt Republic
Oktyabrsky Okrug, Kaluga, an okrug of the city of Kaluga, the administrative center of Kaluga Oblast
Oktyabrsky City District, Kirov, a city district of Kirov, the administrative center of Kirov Oblast
Oktyabrsky City District, Krasnoyarsk, a city district of Krasnoyarsk, the administrative center of Krasnoyarsk Krai
Oktyabrsky Territorial Okrug, Lipetsk, a territorial okrug of the city of Lipetsk, the administrative center of Lipetsk Oblast
Oktyabrsky Administrative Okrug, Murmansk, an administrative okrug of the city of Murmansk, the administrative center of Murmansk Oblast
Oktyabrsky City District, Novosibirsk, a city district of Novosibirsk, the administrative center of Novosibirsk Oblast
Oktyabrsky Administrative Okrug, Omsk, an administrative okrug of the city of Omsk, the administrative center of Omsk Oblast
Oktyabrsky City District, Orsk, a city district of Orsk, a city in Orenburg Oblast
Oktyabrsky City District, Penza, a city district of Penza, the administrative center of Penza Oblast
Oktyabrsky City District, Rostov-on-Don, a city district of Rostov-on-Don, the administrative center of Rostov Oblast
Oktyabrsky City District, Ryazan, a city district of Ryazan, the administrative center of Ryazan Oblast
Oktyabrsky City District, Samara, an administrative and municipal city district of Samara, the administrative center of Samara Oblast
Oktyabrsky City District, Saransk, a city district of Saransk, the capital of the Republic of Mordovia
Oktyabrsky City District, Saratov, a city district of Saratov, the administrative center of Saratov Oblast
Oktyabrsky City District, Stavropol, a city district of Stavropol, the administrative center of Stavropol Krai
Oktyabrsky City District, Tambov, a city district of Tambov, the administrative center of Tambov Oblast
Oktyabrsky City District, Tomsk, a city district of Tomsk, the administrative center of Tomsk Oblast
Oktyabrsky City District, Ufa, a city district of Ufa, the capital of the Republic of Bashkortostan
Oktyabrsky City District, Ulan-Ude, a city district of Ulan-Ude, the capital of the Republic of Buryatia
Oktyabrsky City District, Vladimir, a city district of Vladimir, the administrative center of Vladimir Oblast
Oktyabrsky City District, Yekaterinburg, a city district of Yekaterinburg, the administrative center of Sverdlovsk Oblast

Renamed districts
Oktyabrsky District, name of Takhtamukaysky District of the Republic of Adygea, Russia, until 1990
Oktyabrsky District, name of Nurlatsky District of the Republic of Tatarstan, Russia, until 1997

Historical districts
Oktyabrsky District, Kalinin Oblast, a former district in Leningrad, Western, Kalinin, and Velikiye Luki Oblasts, merged into Zapadnodvinsky District in 1963.
Oktyabrsky District, Saint Petersburg, a district of the federal city of St. Petersburg; merged into the newly established Admiralteysky District in March 1994

Historical city districts
Oktyabrsky Administrative District, a city district of Kaliningrad, the administrative center of Kaliningrad Oblast; merged into Tsentralny Administrative District in 2009

See also
Oktyabrsky (disambiguation)
Oktyabrsky Okrug (disambiguation)

References